God's Smile or The Odessa Story is a 2008 Russian comedy film directed by Vladimir Alenikov.

Plot 
The film tells about the rich old Odessa citizen Philip Olshansky, who is preparing for death and preparing a will. To help him, his grandson Allen goes to Odessa, where he will find a lot of adventures.

Cast 
 Ivan Zhidkov as Alen
 Mariya Gorban
 Antonina Sutyagina as Pozhila Anna
 Armen Dzhigarkhanyan as Filipp Olshansky
 Dmitriy Sergin as Molodoy Filipp
 Roman Kartsev as Perepmuter
 Tamara Tana as Elvira
 Aleksandr Pankratov-Chyorny as Ryzhak
 Nina Usatova as Madam Parnokopytenko
 Tatyana Novik as Galya

References

External links 
 

2008 films
2000s Russian-language films
Russian comedy films
2008 comedy films